Xavier Mark Sellathambu (20 October 1917 – 26 March 1984) was a Sri Lankan Tamil civil servant, politician and Member of Parliament.

Early life
Sellathambu was born on 20 October 1917. He was married to Mary Josephine.

Career
Sellathambu was Divisional Revenue Officer for Mullaitivu.

Sellathambu stood as the Illankai Tamil Arasu Kachchi's (Federal Party) candidate in Vavuniya at the 1970 parliamentary election. He won the election and entered Parliament.

On 14 May 1972 the ITAK, All Ceylon Tamil Congress, Ceylon Workers' Congress, Eelath Thamilar Otrumai Munnani and All Ceylon Tamil Conference formed the Tamil United Front, later renamed Tamil United Liberation Front (TULF).

Sellathambu was the TULF's candidate in Mullaitivu at the 1977 parliamentary election and was re-elected. He was Chief Opposition Whip from 1977 to 1983.

Sellathambu and all other TULF MPs boycotted Parliament from the middle of 1983 for a number of reasons: they were under pressure from Sri Lankan Tamil militants not to stay in Parliament beyond their normal six-year term; the Sixth Amendment to the Constitution of Sri Lanka required them to swear an oath unconditionally renouncing support for a separate state; and the Black July riots in which up to 3,000 Tamils were murdered by Sinhalese mobs. After three months of absence, Sellathambu forfeited his seat in Parliament on 21 October 1983. Sellathambu died in March 1984 at the age of 66.

References

1917 births
1984 deaths
Illankai Tamil Arasu Kachchi politicians
Members of the 7th Parliament of Ceylon
Members of the 8th Parliament of Sri Lanka
People from Northern Province, Sri Lanka
People from British Ceylon
Sri Lankan Tamil civil servants
Sri Lankan Tamil politicians
Tamil United Liberation Front politicians